A depth finder may refer to any of the following:

 Sonar: use of underwater sound propagation to measure depth
 Fathometer or fishfinder: a device to locate fish at various water depths
 Echo sounding: a technique using sound pulses to measure depth
 sounding line: a length of rope used to measure water depth